Ethan Terence Jolley (born 29 March 1997) is a professional Gibraltarian footballer who plays as a defender for Europa and the Gibraltar national team. He is the cousin of fellow national team footballer Tjay De Barr.

Career
Jolley made his international debut for Gibraltar on 26 March 2019, coming on as a substitute for Tjay De Barr in second-half stoppage time of the friendly match against Estonia, which finished as a 0–1 home loss.

Career statistics

International

References

External links
 
 
 

1997 births
Living people
Gibraltarian footballers
Gibraltar youth international footballers
Gibraltar under-21 international footballers
Gibraltar international footballers
Association football central defenders
Europa F.C. players
Lincoln Red Imps F.C. players
Lynx F.C. players
Mons Calpe S.C. players
Gibraltar Premier Division players